The Festa do Peão de Barretos (Portuguese for "Cowboy Festival of Barretos") is a rodeo featuring bulls and horses. In Barretos, Brazil, hundreds such festivals are held throughout the year.  The Festa do Peão is one of the most famous such festivals, and has become world-famous for its size. The festival is held every year in the São Paulo (state) city of Barretos, where it has traditionally been organized and promoted by the social club Os Independentes ("The Independents").

History

The festival has its origins in the transfer of cattle from pasturing in the nearby states of Minas Gerais, Goiás, Mato Grosso do Sul, and Mato Grosso to slaughterhouses in Barretos. The cowboys in the "entourages" that led the herds would meet in the afternoons and compete with each other to see who could ride the most spirited horses - the precursor to today's competition. The more difficult tradition of riding bulls instead of horses was brought from the United States.

In 1955, in Barretos, a group of bachelors organized the first recorded Festa do Peão de Boiadeiro. Since that time the festival has become world-famous for its scale, and the high quality of cowboys, horses, and bulls. The festival takes place every August, coinciding with the anniversary of the founding of Barretos, August 25. It continues to be organized by The Independents.

2005 was the 50th annual Festa. Until 1984, the festivities took place in Paulo de Lima park, in the center of Barretos, where memorable expositions of cattle took place during the 60s through the 80s. Since 1985 The Independents have held the event in a 110-hectare park with a stadium large enough to hold 35 thousand people, designed by renowned Brazilian architect Oscar Niemeyer.

During its history, the festival has brought to Brazil some great international superstars, such as Shakira, Garth Brooks, Alan Jackson, Gloria Gaynor, A-Ha, Mariah Carey and Shania Twain. 

Twain's concert was probably the festival's most notable attraction to date, considered by the media as a national event at the time, as Festa do Peão had been trying to negotiate a show with the singer for over 20 years and agreed to pay a fee of R$ 4 million for her to come to Brazil. Speculation for the show began in 2017, when a Brazilian music insider released uncertain information that raised doubts in the public who initially confused the journalist's description of Twain with Taylor Swift. The official announcement of the concert was made on the official Festa do Peão page on February 26, 2018, and reached a mark of 1.3 million views on the Facebook platform alone.

Twain was received in Barretos on August 16, 2018 with media coverage, and later by thousands of fans at Parque do Peão. During her stay in Brazil, the artist went on horseback rides and enjoyed the farm that was exclusively prepared by Festa do Peão to receive her and her team, which had a vegan chef and many of the artist's demands. The concert and its national promotion were great successes, causing the organizers of the event to reform the stadium's structure to fit more people, and chartering fleets of planes printed with Twain's face to take fans to the festival.

One million people visited Parque do Peão on the weekend of the event. Brazilian late country star Marília Mendonça and pop singer Bastian Baker opened Twain's concert, which started at midnight for an audience of 100,000. The singer's team did not allow the concert to be shown live on TV, what caused the fury of part of her fanbase, who criticized the attitude on Twitter. Media outlets in Brazil, such as G1, reviewed the concert, pointing it out as one of the best of the year, and one of the best ever performed at the festival. Much of the public on the internet cited Shania's show as the biggest attraction in the history of the Festa do Peão.

External links
  Os Independentes - Organizers' home page

Sport in São Paulo (state)
Cultural festivals in Brazil
Rodeos
Festivals in São Paulo
Animal festival or ritual
Rodeo in Brazil